The Italian submarine Flutto was the name ship of her class of submarines built for the Royal Italian Navy (Regia Marina) during World War II. She obtained no successes during her short career, and was sunk by British ships during the Invasion of Sicily in 1943.

Design and description
The Flutto-class submarines were designed as improved versions of the preceding . They displaced  surfaced and  submerged.

For surface running, the boats were powered by two  diesel engines, each driving one propeller shaft. When submerged each propeller was driven by a  electric motor. They could reach  on the surface and  underwater.

The boats were armed with six internal  torpedo tubes, four in the bow and two in the stern. One reload were stowed for each tube, which gave them a total of twelve torpedoes. They were also armed with one  deck gun and two  anti-aircraft guns for combat on the surface.

Construction and career
Flutto was built by CRDA at Monfalcone on the Adriatic coast, and was launched on 19 November 1942. After commissioning and working up Flutto saw action against Allied naval forces in the Mediterranean. She had no successes, and was lost in action in July 1943 operating against Allied forces involved in Operation Husky, the invasion of Sicily. On 11 July 1943 Flutto was on patrol in the Straits of Messina when she was detected and sunk by three British Motor Torpedo Boats (MTB’s 640, 651 and 670) with her entire crew of 49.

Notes

References

External links
 Sommergibili Marina Militare website

Flutto-class submarines
1942 ships
Ships built in Monfalcone
Ships built by Cantieri Riuniti dell'Adriatico
World War II submarines of Italy
Maritime incidents in July 1943
World War II shipwrecks in the Mediterranean Sea
Ships lost with all hands